Seeberger is a surname. Notable people with the surname include:

Charles Seeberger (1857–1931), American inventor
Herbert Seeberger (born 1949), German sport shooter
Jürgen Seeberger (born 1965), German football manager
Matt Seeberger (born 1984), American tennis player
Peter Seeberger (born 1966), German chemist
Surnames of Swiss origin
German-language surnames